Serghei Svinarenco (born 18 September 1996) is a Moldovan footballer who plays as a defender for Moldovan National Division club Sfântul Gheorghe, on loan from Sheriff Tiraspol.

Honours
Sheriff Tiraspol
Moldovan National Division: 2015–16, 2016–17
Moldovan Cup: 2014–15, 2016–17
Moldovan Super Cup: 2015, 2016

References

External links

1996 births
Living people
Moldovan footballers
Association football defenders
People from Tiraspol
Moldovan Super Liga players
FC Sheriff Tiraspol players
CS Petrocub Hîncești players
CSF Bălți players
FC Sfîntul Gheorghe players